Scarpati is an Italian surname. Notable people with the surname include:

 Giulio Scarpati (born 1956), Italian actor
 Joe Scarpati (born 1943), American football player
 John Scarpati (born 1960), American professional photographer

Italian-language surnames